The Dunc McCallum Memorial Trophy is awarded annually to the Coach of the Year in the Western Hockey League.  It was named in honour of Dunc McCallum, who coached the Brandon Wheat Kings from 1976–81, compiling a 251–123–41 record during that time, winning the WHL Championship in 1979.

List of winners

Blue background denotes also named CHL Coach of the Year
1The WHL handed out separate awards for the East and West divisions.

See also
Brian Kilrea Coach of the Year Award
Matt Leyden Trophy - Ontario Hockey League Coach of the Year
Ron Lapointe Trophy - Quebec Major Junior Hockey League Coach of the Year

References

Western Hockey League trophies and awards
Canada 4